The cuisine of Baden is considered one of the best regional cuisines in Germany. Nationwide this region features the highest density of star-rated restaurants, similar to the neighbouring region Alsace which does the same for France.

Due to the physio-geographical situation, the Upper Rhine Plain with Germany's warmest climate, fruitful volcanic soils, already in the Roman period used medicinal springs and spas with very good infrastructural features, the proximity to France and Switzerland Baden had better prerequisites to develop a high quality gastronomy than Württemberg or Bavaria. Special plant crops such as tobacco, wine, fruit and horticulture are of supranational importance and offer the inhabitants and visitors a diverse and wide selection of local products. Asparagus and chestnuts are as skilfully used in the kitchen as tripe and escargot and a variety of fruity desserts and pastries is provided for the traditional German "Kaffee und Kuchen" (lit. "coffee and cake", similar to the British tea time).

Considering these important gastronomical traditions it may be surprising how small the amount of dishes is that are really specifically and distinctively from Baden. First of all it does evince great regional differences and many basic recipes and ingredients were adapted and modified from neighbouring countries. This happened with an ease that is much greater as in other German regional cuisines and as one of the greatest influences came from the French cuisine, the cuisine of Baden is lighter than the cuisines of e.g. Swabia, the Palatinate or Bavaria which feature heartier dishes and have a peasant background.

Genuinely from Baden are the high quality and broad selection of local products and pronounced culinary tradition that incorporates and combines many different influences. The Baden cuisine indulges in fruit, herbs and vegetables, game, poultry, fish, smoked products and sausages, wine, Edelbrand, beer and juices from local producers. Spätzle and egg pasta are prepared with more egg than in neighbouring Swabia. 
The legend tells that the traditional and internationally famous Schwarzwälder Kirschtorte was first prepared in the city of Tübingen (which is in Württemberg) but is based on a simple but very tasty dessert from the Black Forest featuring cherries, Kirschwasser and cream.

The bohemian, home-cooking Baden cuisine did incorporate many influences from the Alsace and Switzerland. Specialities such as Baeckeoffe and Flammkuchen, Sauerkraut or Schäufele are as famous for Baden as for the Alsace and in both region it is typical to use much flour and fat in the recipes.
The unusual combination of sweet and hearty dishes was adapted from Palatine cuisine as was the generous usage of many different wines in a meal.

Appetizers

Flädle soup
Escargot soup
Valerianella mit Kracherle
Egg drop soup (similar to Italian stracciatella)

Main dishes
Roe deer roast, called "Rehrücken Baden-Baden"
Sulz
Egli
Schäufele
Landjäger
Bibbeliskäs (in the South also called "Bibbeleskäs", in the North "white cheese")
Käsespätzle
Maultaschen
Ox breast with horseradish sauce

Side dishes
Schupfnudeln (Bubespitzle)
Spätzle (also "Knöpfli")
Potato salad (usually mixed with a brew of meat broth, vinegar, oil, salt, pepper and mustard, but without mayonnaise)
Pancake
"Steamed potato", raw seared potato pieces which are then cooked in water and are subsequently seared once again until they are crispy
"Rauhbrägeldi", raw home fries
Pretzel

Sweet dishes

Kirschenmichel
Covered apple pie
Badischi Schärbe
Strübli
Ofenschlupfer
Scheiterhaufen
Schwarzwälder Kirschtorte
Wähe

See also
 Baden (wine region)

References

External links
 Badische Küche